Aechmea calyculata is a species of flowering plant in the Bromeliaceae family.

Distribution
The bromeliad is endemic to the Atlantic Forest biome (Mata Atlantica Brasileira). It is native to southern Brazil in the states of Paraná, Santa Catarina, and Rio Grande do Sul; and in eastern Argentina in Misiones province.

Cultivars and hybrids
Cultivars and hybrids of Aechmea calyculata include:
 Aechmea 'Alaya'
 Aechmea 'Ann Vincent'
 Aechmea 'Gemma'
 Aechmea 'Len Butt'
 Aechmea 'Mini-Cal'
 Aechmea 'Phoenix'
 Aechmea 'Solo'
 × Nidumea 'Loeseneri'

References

calyculata
Flora of Brazil
Flora of Argentina
Flora of Espírito Santo
Flora of Misiones Province
Flora of Paraná (state)
Flora of Santa Catarina (state)
Plants described in 1865
Taxa named by John Gilbert Baker
Taxa named by Charles Jacques Édouard Morren